Doctor Who – Battles in Time is an out-of-print trading card game and fortnightly magazine from the partwork publishers GE Fabbri, who acquired the license to produce Battles in Time. The game and magazine were first released in mid-April 2006 in two 'test-regions' in the United Kingdom and was made available across the UK on 20 September 2006. The magazine was released in Australia a few months later. However, only in South Australia was it made available in newsagents; in the rest of Australia it was available by subscription with the distributor only. The subscription and back issue services have now been removed from the official website. Battles in Time magazines are no longer available and the last issue (number 70) was released on 13 May 2009.
A definitive resource for information relating to Battles in Time can be found at Doctor Who-Battles in Time.

Test Run
The test series was run in the Westcountry and Grampian television areas of the UK at a test market to see if Battles in Time would be popular. It released 7 pilot Magazines and a "test set" version of the Exterminator card set comprising only 85 cards, plus a "test set" Super Rose. These 85 cards were essentially the same as the first 85 cards of the Exterminator set that was released nationally. However, card 42 featuring "Captain Jack" had a picture change in the national set.
Test set cards are recognized as they did not include the icon, in the bottom left of the card, which would subsequently be used to identify common, rare, super rare and ultra rare cards. Also, test set information cards had a lightning icon within a triangle above the information box. This was amended for the national release to an oval shape. This can be seen, for example, in the Ultra Rare cards in the series and also the test set Super Rose card.

Complete sets of this 85 card set are very rare, particularly if they include the test set Super Rose card as there were very few test set Super Rose cards manufactured.

The magazine
Each issue of the magazine includes :

Rules for a different game each issue (not in issues 61 onwards)
Deck Doctor (although no Deck Doctor in issue 1)
Deck Doctor puzzles based on the cards (since issue 61)
Comparison between cards; e.g. Rose vs Cassandra, Doctor vs Dalek Emperor, Captain Jack vs Empty Child.
A guide on each episode with scenarios based on the episode that can be played with the cards.
Fold-out guides to a different monster each issue, with notes on cards that feature that monster.
Behind-the-scenes guide to certain monsters or shots.
Comic strip story drawn by John Ross [issues 1 to 6] and Lee Sullivan. Colours by Alan Craddock
Artwork depicting the "Dalek Wars"
Doctor Who themed puzzles.
"Which hero/monster are you?" quizzes.

Comic stories
Each issue has a four-page comic story. Occasionally these are [stand-alone] stories but usually they fit into story arcs over many issues.

Special editions

Four special issues have been released (Daleks V.S Cybermen, Invader, Ultimate Monsters and Devastator). These contain several packs of cards of the current set.

Game rules 
Each issue of the magazine included a section with rules for different card games, and also a FAQ section in order to clarify some aspects from the previous games, specially after the release of the new sets.

In the game rules section of the official webpage are explained two different versions of the most popular variation of the game, which can be played with the cards included on the magazine or packs bought separately; the first one Bunch of Fives, and the second one Bonus Buster.

Bunch of Fives 
This version excludes bonus cards, and it requires a previously made deck of 20 character cards per player. The game follows this system of rounds:
 Both players deal five cards to themselves and leave the rest of the cards upside down on their draw pile.
 The first player looks at all five cards in his hand, picks one of them, then one of the five attributes and finally the player calls out the green score on the card.
 The second player checks all five cards of his hand to see if any of them can beat the card the first player has used. The second player has to use the red score in the same category. If he can't win he has to decide which card to sacrifice.
 The winner puts his card on the bottom of his draw pile. The loser puts his card to one side so it's out of play.
 Each player then picks a card from the top of his draw pile (both players must always have five cards at the start of each round). The winner picks the next card/category.
The game ends when one player has lost all of his cards.

Bonus Buster 
This version is a variation of the Bunch of Fives game including bonus cards. In this variation, the deck should be composed of at least 15 cards per player. It is recommendable to use up to 20 cards, but both players must always have the same number of cards on their decks. The maximum number of bonus cards that may be taken on each deck is 2.

The rules in Bonus Buster follow the same structure as Bunch of Fives, but two new steps are added after steps 2 and 3. After the second step, the first player can use a bonus card if he has one in his hand. The effect of the bonus card is applied immediately after using it. Then if the bonus card played by the first player allows it, the second player makes step 3 normally, and after it, he can also use another bonus card. It is not compulsory that the first player has used a bonus card so that the second player can use one. Once the bonus card has been used, it goes with the rest of cards out of play, and the player picks two cards from the top of his draw pile.

Card sets 
 
In addition to the rare "test set" described above, six national release card sets were issued.

The Exterminator set totals 275 cards and was issued on 20 September 2006. It covered the 2005 and 2006 series, plus the 2005 Christmas special The Christmas Invasion.

The Annihilator set, comprises 100 cards, taken from the first two series and the 2006 Christmas special The Runaway Bride. This set was released on 21 February 2007.

A Daleks vs Cybermen special was released 16 May 2007. This special came with a set of 18 cards, including 16 common cards and one of four variants of both a Dalek and Cyberman rare, making the full set 24 cards, and not the 18 that are usually found advertised as a full set.

The Invader set, released on 5 September 2007 consists of 225 cards from the 2007 series.

The Ultimate Monsters set was released on 5 March 2008. This 225 card set is primarily sourced from the "Classic Series" of Doctor Who that ran from 1963 to 1989. Other cards came from the 2007 Christmas special Voyage of the Damned as well as the first three series of the revamped show.

The most recent release is the Devastator set which is based on the 2007 Christmas Special and the 2008 series of Doctor Who. The Devastator set was released on 17 September 2008 from issue 53. A special issue with four free packs and a series 4 guide was also released on 17 September 2008 priced £4.99.

Additional cards released include an unnumbered card, 'Super Rose', which may be found in every 1,000 packs of each of the five main series, the 'psychic paper' card, which only came with the first issue of the magazine series, and a lenticular card, 'Dalek Blaster' unnumbered and distributed with the special issue launching the Invader series.

A special edition pack of cards on The Sarah Jane Adventures came with Issue 62 as a one-off set. There were 10 cards in total.

An additional variant card is the variation between the test set cards 42 - Captain Jack - which had featured photograph changes between the two sets.

Overview
There were five different main card sets in the national series. These are:

There were two other, special, sets, which were
Daleks vs Cybermen (2007). Released in two different packs, 'Daleks' and 'Cybermen'. There were 18 cards, the first sixteen were shiny, but "common", the remaining two were of a super-rare texture, but designated "rare". These came in four different images, making the complete set of 24 cards.
Adventurer (2008). All ten cards were released in a special packet. Cards from The Sarah Jane Adventures. Released in Issue 62.

Additionally, there were some special, un- 1,000 packets of all five main sets. It was titled the "golden ticket" on the packets, this being because the back of the card was partially gold. The card itself is a lenticular card, in a similar manner to the ultra-rare cards.
"Dalek Blaster". This was a special lenticular card of a dalek being 'blasted', and came free with the "Invader" launch special magazine.
"Psychic Paper". A special card with a piece of red film over one part of the card, which could be placed over some of the bonus cards to reveal their playing effect. It came in the first issue only. The card is named after the gadget owned by The Doctor in the show, a gadget which was not given a trading card in any of the five sets.
There was a special card in the Adventurer set which was used at the front of the transparent packet. It simply shows the logo for the Adventurer set, the Doctor Who Battles in Time logo, and a picture of the cast from The Sarah Jane Adventures. There are 10 cards in total.

Notes

Battles in Time
Battles in Time
Card games introduced in 2006
Collectible card games